The 1949 Oklahoma A&M Cowboys football team represented Oklahoma Agricultural and Mechanical College (later renamed Oklahoma State University–Stillwater) in the Missouri Valley Conference during the 1949 college football season. In their 11th and final year under head coach Jim Lookabaugh, the Cowboys compiled a 4–4–2 record (1–2–1 against conference opponents), finished in third place in the conference, and outscored opponents by a combined total of 223 to 212.

On offense, the 1949 team averaged 22.3 points, 151.5 rushing yards, and 177.7 passing yards per game.  On defense, the team allowed an average of 21.2 points, 158.3 rushing yards and 213.3 passing yards per game. The team's statistical leaders included halfback Ken Roof with 466 rushing yards, Jack Hartman with 1,278 passing yards, Alex Loyd with 657 receiving yards, and Don Van Pool with 36 points scored.

Four Oklahoma A&M players received first-team All-Missouri Valley Conference honors in 1949: tackle Charles Shaw, guard Clayton Davis, end Alex Loyd, and back Jack Hartman.

The team played its home games at Lewis Field in Stillwater, Oklahoma.

Schedule

After the season

The 1950 NFL Draft was held on January 20–21, 1950. The following Cowboys were selected.

References

Oklahoma AandM
Oklahoma State Cowboys football seasons
Oklahoma AM